Ralph Bonner Pink (30 September 1912 – 6 May 1984) was a British Conservative politician.

Pink was educated at Oundle School and was a company director. He served as a councillor on Portsmouth City Council (1948–61), then as an alderman, and was Lord Mayor of Portsmouth for 1961–62.

Pink was the Member of Parliament for Portsmouth South from 1966 until he died in office in May 1984, aged 71. He was a member of the Speaker's panel of chairmen.

References

The Times Guide to the House of Commons, Times Newspapers Ltd, 1966 & 1983

External links 
 

1912 births
1984 deaths
Conservative Party (UK) MPs for English constituencies
Councillors in Hampshire
Politicians from Portsmouth
Lord Mayors of Portsmouth
People educated at Oundle School
UK MPs 1966–1970
UK MPs 1970–1974
UK MPs 1974
UK MPs 1974–1979
UK MPs 1979–1983
UK MPs 1983–1987